The office of the governor of Qazvin was a historical office whose holders were tasked with the governance of the city and region of Qazvin. The administrative unit of Qazvin included most of today's Qazvin province, sometimes including or excluding parts such as Taleqan, Alamut, Tarom, Soltaniyeh and Savojbolagh. The office was not hereditary and the governors were assigned directly by the Shah.

The governors of Qazvin were seated in the Safavid royal complex during Safavid dynasty and later governments.

The office was replaced with the Ostandar of Qazvin after the Qajar dynasty.

Qajar dynasty 
Note: Data in reference is given in Islamic calendar, and converting to the Gregorian calendar would have been inaccurate as years would correspond to two Gregorian calendar years. Thus, the dates are given in the Islamic calendar and an approximate Gregorian conversion is also given.

*He was briefly demoted during his first time as governor of Qazvin

References 

 
 

Qazvin